James Paul Maher (November 3, 1865 – July 31, 1946) was an American labor union official, businessman, and politician.  A Democrat, he is most notable for his service as a U.S. Representative from New York, a position he held for five terms (1911-1921).

Early life
Maher was born in Brooklyn, New York, one of several children born to Irish immigrants John and Maria Maher.  He attended the parochial schools of Brooklyn and graduated from Brooklyn's St. Patrick's Academy.  Apprenticed as a hatter, he moved to Danbury, Connecticut in 1887 and was employed as a hat sizer and in other positions on the factory floor.

Career
He was active in his local union and the American Federation of Labor.  Maher became treasurer of the United Hatters of North America in 1897, a post he held until his election to Congress.  As a labor union leader, he gained a reputation for successful mediation and adjudication of worker-management disputes.  Maher returned to Brooklyn in 1902 and was active with several charitable and fraternal organizations, including the Civic Association of New York, Society of the Holy Name, Knights of Columbus, and Benevolent and Protective Order of Elks.

Maher was an unsuccessful candidate for election to the Sixty-first Congress in 1908. He was elected as a Democrat to the Sixty-second and to the four succeeding Congresses (March 4, 1911 – March 3, 1921). He served as chairman of the Committee on Expenditures in the Department of Labor (Sixty-third through Sixty-fifth Congresses). He was an unsuccessful candidate for reelection in 1920 to the Sixty-seventh Congress.

After leaving Congress, Maher entered the real estate business in Brooklyn.  He later moved to Keansburg, New Jersey, where he continued in real estate. In 1925, Keansburg employed a borough manager to oversee the local government's day to day operations, and reduced the size of its town council from five members to three.  Maher ran successfully for a seat on the council, and was the top vote getter among the candidates.  Upon taking office in January 1926, Maher was chosen to serve as mayor.  He served until March 1927, when voter dissatisfaction with a significant increase in the municipal budget and the taxes to fund it led to his recall.  In 1937, Maher was an unsuccessful candidate for the town council.

Death and burial
Maher died in Keansburg on July 31, 1946. He was buried at St. Joseph's Cemetery, Keyport, New Jersey.

Family
In 1890, Maher married Mary Jane (Moran) Maher (1867-1937).  They were the parents of a son, Charles Maher, who lived in Keansburg.

References

Sources 

American milliners
American people of Irish descent
1865 births
1946 deaths
Mayors of places in New Jersey
People from Keansburg, New Jersey
New Jersey Democrats
Democratic Party members of the United States House of Representatives from New York (state)
American trade union leaders
Burials in New Jersey
Catholics from New York (state)
Members of the United States House of Representatives from New York (state)